George Francis Frazier Jr. (June 10, 1911 – June 13, 1974) was an American journalist. Frazier was raised in South Boston, attended the Boston Latin School, and was graduated from Harvard College (where he won the Boylston Prize for Rhetoric) in 1932. He wrote for the Boston newspapers and for Esquire magazine, as well as many other venues, including the New York papers. Beginning as a jazz critic, his Sweet and Low Down column, debuting in the Boston Herald on January 27, 1942, was the first regular jazz column in an American big-city daily. He soon left jazz criticism for general journalism. He concluded his career as a much-revered columnist for The Boston Globe.

Called "Acidmouth" by his publishers at Down Beat, he was known for his arch style, acerbic wit, erudite Olympian pronouncements on men's fashion, and general je ne sais quoi.

Frazier wrote the song "Harvard Blues" (music by Tab Smith), recorded in 1941 by Count Basie and included on the compilation The Count Basie Story, Disc 3 - Harvard Blues (2001, Proper Records).

Thanks to his writing, Frazier earned a place on the master list of Nixon political opponents.

Links to writings by Frazier
 "The Art of Wearing Clothes", article by George Frazier, Esquire magazine, September 1960
 "Whose Civil Rights", column by George Frazier, Boston Herald, August 30, 1963
 Small sample of Frazier's jazz criticism from 1942, JazzBoston
 "Warlord of the Weejuns", Frazier's liner notes for the 1965 album Miles Davis' Greatest Hits (reprinted in Ivy Style, May 10, 2010)

References

 
 
 
 
 
 
 

1911 births
Harvard College alumni
American male journalists
American columnists
Jazz writers
Obituary writers
1974 deaths
20th-century American non-fiction writers
20th-century American male writers
The Boston Globe people